C. R. Parthiban (1 July 1931 – 25 January 2021) was an Indian actor who worked mainly in Tamil cinema and theatre. He was best known for his performance as Jackson Durai in Veerapandiya Kattabomman (1959).

Biography 
Parthiban was born in Vellore, and was a descendant of C. Rajagopalachari. In 1946, he moved to Madras (now Chennai).

Death 
Parthiban died on 25 January 2021 at the age of 90.

Notable filmography 
C. R. Parthiban acted in more than 120 movies.
 Pudhumai Pithan (1957)
 Vanji Kottai Valipan (1958)
 Veerapandiya Kattabomman (1959)
 Kappalottiya Thamizhan (1961)
 Aalayamani (1962)
 Sumaithaangi (1962)
 Motor Sundaram Pillai (1966)
 Sange Muzhangu (1972)
 Then Sindhudhe Vaanam (1975)
 Idhayakkani (1975)
 Navarathinam (1977)
 Moondru Mugam (1982)
 Kaakki Sattai (1985)
 Viduthalai (1986)
 Chinna Vathiyar (1995)

References

External links 
 

1929 births
2021 deaths
Indian male film actors
Male actors from Tamil Nadu
Male actors in Tamil cinema